Ronald Albert West (27 April 1914 – 22 October 1992) was a British racewalker. He competed in the men's 10 kilometres walk at the 1948 Summer Olympics.

References

External links
 

1914 births
1992 deaths
Athletes (track and field) at the 1948 Summer Olympics
British male racewalkers
Olympic athletes of Great Britain
Place of birth missing